Luis Pérez Pascual (born 9 February 1971 in San Sebastián, Basque Country) is a Spanish former professional footballer who played as a forward.

References

External links

1971 births
Living people
Spanish footballers
Footballers from San Sebastián
Association football forwards
La Liga players
Segunda División players
Segunda División B players
CD Hernani players
Real Sociedad B footballers
Real Sociedad footballers
CA Osasuna players
Real Unión footballers
Spain under-23 international footballers
Basque Country international footballers